Spindrift is a weather effect.

Spindrift may also refer to:

Boats and ships
 Spindrift 13, a 1965 Canadian sailboat design
 HMSAS Spindrift, a captured WWII German merchant raider called Polaris, transferred to the South African Naval Forces in 1940 and renamed

Brands and enterprises
Adnams Spindrift, a beer brewed by Adnams Brewery
Spindrift Beverage Co., a beverage company

Fictional entities
Spindrift, a fictional novel written by the character Lady Florence Cray in the Jeeves stories
Spindrift, a fictional ship in Land of the Giants

Geography
 Spindrift Alley, a gully on the mountain Nanda Devi

Literature
Spindrift (novel), a science fiction novel

Music
Spindrift (band), a rock band
"Spindrift" (song), a song by Rush